Mylappapuram is a small village located in Tirunelveli city. Mylappapuram has many temples and churches. Temple festivals grantly celebrating every year . Tamilnad Mercantile Bank Limited Vengadampatti Branch is located here . Then a church nearly 100 years old is also here which is now renovated. A tasmac bar is also located. it has the big bus stand named  kamarajar bus stand. and  huge water tanks which supply thamirabarani water all over the village.

Mylappapuram, a small village which has surrounded by many natural resources and waterfalls like Kutralam falls, Papanasam dam, Ramanathi dam, Kadananathi dam. Thamirabarani is the biggest and perennial river and it support 2 districts.

Mylappapuram 
 Mylappapuram
 South Mylappapuram
 Rajakkalkudiyirupu
 Arunthathiyar colony (East Street)
 Kamaraj Nagar

Streets of Mylappuram
 North Street, (CSI street) Church of South India), RC Church street, North street
 West Street,   
 South Street,
 East Street

Places of Mylappapuram
  Subramaniya swami Temple
 Roman Catholic church - Assi church
 Mylappapuram Tuesday Market
 Avvaiyar amman temple
 Mupputathi amman temple
 St. Andrew's church [Church of South India]
 south mylappuram amman Temple
 south mylappuram ramar Temple
 south mylappuram kalaswami Temple
 South mylappuram sudalai madaswami temble
 St. Thomas Church { Church Of  South India}
 Naddu st amman kovil mylappapuram
 Poi kaatha Sudali Mada Swamy
 Thirumal Iyyan Temple

Sports teams of 
 ANV stars mylai ( cricket Team)
chain Gang Group, Mylai. [cricket Team]
 Mylai cool guys
 New 11 stars
 shadow boys in south mylai
 Rajakudiyiruppu royal challengers (Rrc cricket)
 7 Nanbargal [Kabadi Team] 
 Action Boys
 Fire Friends [Cricket Team]
Star kings group, Rajakudiyiruppu{cricket team}

Festivals 
 Vaikasi visagam,
 Pankuni Uthiram 
 Pongal
 thirukarthigai deepam,
 
Villages in Tirunelveli district